Chondrostoma kinzelbachi, sometimes known as the Orontes nase or Levantine nase, is a species of ray-finned fish in the family Cyprinidae.
It is found in Syria and Turkey.
Its natural habitats are rivers and intermittent rivers.
It is threatened by habitat loss.

References

 

Chondrostoma
Fish described in 1985
Taxonomy articles created by Polbot